Melanie Wade Goodwin (July 22, 1970 – September 1, 2020) was an American politician who served in the North Carolina House of Representatives from the 66th district as a member of the Democratic Party. She was the first member of the North Carolina General Assembly to give birth while in office.

Early life

Melanie Wade Goodwin was born to Albert and Nancy Wade on July 22, 1970, in Richmond, Virginia. in 1988, she graduated from Jesse O. Sanderson High School. In 1992, Goodwin graduated from the University of North Carolina at Chapel Hill with a Bachelor of Arts in English. She later graduated from Campbell University with a Juris Doctor. In 2000, she was admitted to the North Carolina State Bar.

On May 16, 1998, she married Wayne Goodwin, a member of the North Carolina House of Representatives, with whom she had two children.

North Carolina House of Representatives
In 2004, Wayne Goodwin announced that he would seek election as North Carolina's Labor Commissioner rather than seek a fifth term in the North Carolina House of Representatives. Melanie Goodwin ran as the Democratic nominee and won in the general election. She was reelected in 2006, and 2008. In 2009, she announced that she would not seek a fourth term in the North Carolina House of Representatives.

In 2008, she gave birth to her second child, which was the first time a sitting member of the North Carolina General Assembly had given birth.

Later life
Goodwin was appointed to serve as Deputy Commissioner of North Carolina's Industrial Commission on July 8, 2011. On March 1, 2019, she was named as Chief Deputy Commissioner by Chairman Philip Baddour III.

In 2009, Goodwin was diagnosed with breast cancer, and died in Raleigh, North Carolina, on September 1, 2020.

Electoral history

2008

2006

2004

References

1970 births
2020 deaths
21st-century American politicians
21st-century American women politicians
Democratic Party members of the North Carolina House of Representatives
North Carolina lawyers
People from Rockingham, North Carolina
Politicians from Richmond, Virginia
Women state legislators in North Carolina
Deaths from breast cancer